George Leo Leech (May 21, 1890 – March 12, 1985) was an American prelate of the Roman Catholic Church. He served as Bishop of Harrisburg, Pennsylvania, from 1935 to 1971.

Biography

Early life 

George Leech was born on May 21, 1890, in Ashley, Pennsylvania, to William Dillon and Helen Mary (née Fitzimons) Leech. He attended Hanover Township High School in Hanover, Pennsylvania, and St. Charles Borromeo Seminary in Philadelphia. 

Leech was ordained to the priesthood by Archbishop Denis Dougherty on May 29, 1920. He then furthered his studies at the Catholic University of America in Washington, D.C., where he obtained his doctorate in canon law.

Leech served as secretary of the Apostolic Delegation to the United States, and then as pastor of St. Patrick's Parish in Pottsville, Pennsylvania. He was raised to the rank of a privy chamberlain in 1925, and a domestic prelate in 1934.  He also served as spiritual director of the Regional Holy Name Union and moderator of Ecclesiastical Conferences.

Auxiliary Bishop and Bishop of Harrisburg 
On July 6, 1935, Leech was appointed as an auxiliary bishop of the Diocese of Harrisburg and titular bishop of Mela by Pope Pius XI. He received his episcopal consecration on October 17, 1935, from Cardinal Dougherty, with Bishops Thomas O’Reilly and James Ryan serving as co-consecrators.

The pope named Leech as the fifth bishop of Harrisburg on December 19, 1935. After a month as bishop, he had memorized the forenames of all the clergy of his diocese. In 1946, Leech described Howard Hughes’s 1943 film The Outlaw as "a destructive and corrupting picture which glamorizes crime and immorality".

Leech attended the Second Vatican Council from 1962 to 1965; Father William Keeler served as his peritus, or expert, at the Council.

Retirement and legacy 
On October 19, 1971, Pope Paul VI accepted Leech's resignation as bishop of the Diocese of Harrisburg and appointed him as titular bishop of Allegheny.  Leech continued to reside at the episcopal residence.  George Leech died on March 12, 1985, at Holy Spirit Hospital in Harrisburg at age 94. He is buried at Holy Cross Cemetery in Harrisburg.

On August 1, 2018, Bishop Ronald Gainer, Leech's successor as bishop of Harrisburg, announced that the names of every bishop of Harrisburg from 1947 onward – including Leech's – would be removed from any building or room in the diocese named in their honor, due to their failure to protect victims from abuse.

References

External links
Catholic and Orthodox Churches in Northeast Pennsylvania

1890 births
1985 deaths
St. Charles Borromeo Seminary alumni
Catholic University of America alumni
Roman Catholic bishops of Harrisburg
20th-century Roman Catholic bishops in the United States
Participants in the Second Vatican Council